Bazmaghbyur is a village in the Ashtarak Municipality of the Aragatsotn Province of Armenia.

References 

Report of the results of the 2001 Armenian Census

Populated places in Aragatsotn Province
Yazidi populated places in Armenia